Eospalax is a genus of rodents in the family Spalacidae. It contains these species:

Chinese zokor, E. fontanierii 
Rothschild's zokor, E. rothschildi
Smith's zokor, E. smithii

References 

 

 
Rodent genera
Taxa named by Glover Morrill Allen
Endemic fauna of China
Rodents of China